The Călata is a left tributary of the river Crișul Repede in Romania. It discharges into the Crișul Repede near Bologa.

Tributaries

The following rivers are tributaries to the Călata:

Left: Călățele, Bociu, Valea lui Băl, Aluniș

References

Rivers of Romania
Rivers of Cluj County